Georgia Slowe (born 3 June 1966) is an English actress. She is best known for playing Perdita Hyde-Sinclair on the British soap opera Emmerdale from 2006 to 2008.

Slowe received a Laurence Olivier Award nomination for her performance as Juliet in a 1989 production of Romeo and Juliet.

Early life
Slowe was born to Jewish parents. Her mother is from Hungary and her father from a Russian family. The family surname was originally Slovedinski, which was anglicized to Slowe. She has one sister, Tania, who is three years older. Her mother, Zsuzsi, left Hungary after the Hungarian Revolution of 1956 at the age of 16.

Career
Slowe began acting when she was a child and in a career that has spanned nearly 30 years, she played young Maggie Tulliver in the 1978 BBC production of The Mill on the Floss, she has worked alongside Denholm Elliott (Marco Polo), Jenny Agutter (Secret Places), Angela Lansbury (The Company of Wolves), Oliver Reed (Black Arrow) and Richard Chamberlain (Wallenberg). As a member of the Royal Shakespeare Company, Georgia has starred in numerous theatre productions, including Romeo & Juliet, where she played the doomed heroine twice, alongside Mark Rylance and David Harewood. She and David had a short relationship during the production. In 1989, Georgia was nominated for a Laurence Olivier Award for her performance in Romeo & Juliet.

She made a guest appearance on The Family Channel's Zorro as the Native American maiden, Keenona, in its episode "Rites of Passage".

In 2006, Slowe appeared in the long-running serial drama Emmerdale as the new lady of the manor, Perdita Hyde-Sinclair. Her final appearance was broadcast on 22 July 2008, an episode which, for the first time in over three months, had higher viewership than the BBC soap EastEnders.

In 2011, she appeared in the short film Lab Rats. She is a writer and co-producer of the 2014 short film Four Tails, in which she also played a leading role.

Slowe has set up a film production company Slowe Motion Film.

In 2022, she provided an interview for the 2022 4K blu-ray release of The Company of Wolves, reminiscing on Angela Carter as well as her experience working on the film. It was released by Shout! Factory.

Personal life
Slowe was married to Ray Kelvin (founder of the Ted Baker clothing chain) from 1993 until they divorced in 2000. They have two sons. Slowe married photographer Stuart McClymont in 2017.

Filmography

Film

Television

References

External links

Slowe Motion Film

1966 births
Living people
English stage actresses
English television actresses
English people of Jewish descent
English people of Russian-Jewish descent
English people of Hungarian-Jewish descent
English Jews
People educated at South Hampstead High School
Royal Shakespeare Company members